The Nikon AF-S DX VR Zoom-Nikkor 18-200mm 3.5-5.6G IF-ED is an image stabilised superzoom lens manufactured by Nikon for use on Nikon DX format digital SLR cameras. It provides a single-lens "walk-around" solution for wide-angle through to telephoto shots, as well as close-up photography.

Introduction
Nikon announced the first version of this lens on November 1, 2005. The lens offers a 35 film equivalent focal length range of 27-300mm, with a compact silent wave autofocus motor featuring full-time manual override and internal focusing. Its second generation Vibration Reduction technology claims to provide compensation equivalent to an increase in shutter speed of four stops. The lens has sixteen lens elements in twelve groups, with two ED glass elements to reduce chromatic aberration, and three aspherical elements to reduce image distortion. Although this lens was designed for use on Nikon DX format DSLRs, its Nikon F lens mount allows it to be used on Nikon full-frame DSLRs, albeit with vignetting due to a smaller image circle. This lens also works with teleconverters.

On July 30, 2009, Nikon announced an updated variant, the AF-S DX NIKKOR 18-200mm 3.5-5.6G ED VR II. It adds a zoom lock to prevent zoom creep.

Reception
Reviewers have praised the lens for its 11.1x focal length range, effective vibration reduction, excellent autofocus motor and its versatility. However, the lens has been criticised for pronounced and complex distortion across the range, extreme softness at certain focal lengths and zoom creep. Overall, it has garnered generally positive reviews, citing the lens' flexibility and ability to "allow the photographer to travel light and never miss a shot while changing lenses".

Problems

The lens has problems with auto-focus of near subjects and in wide-angle position of infinity subjects on some older Nikon digital camera bodies. The problem occurs in Nikon D 300 S also.

The slow auto-focus problem can be solved in new DSLR cameras disabling the light bulb guide that's built in the body camera. Enabling only one point of focus and enabling "continuous engine focus" or "automatic" instead of single servo, may speed up auto-focus greatly to normal again.

See also
List of Nikon F-mount lenses with integrated autofocus motor

References

External links
 AF-S DX VR Zoom-NIKKOR 18-200mm f/3.5-5.6G IF-ED Product Page at Nikon.com
 AF-S DX NIKKOR 18-200mm f/3.5-5.6G ED VR II  Product Page at Nikon.com
 AF-S DX VR Zoom-NIKKOR 18-200mm f/3.5-5.6G IF-ED review at Digital Photography Review
 AF-S DX VR Zoom-NIKKOR 18-200mm f/3.5-5.6G IF-ED review at Cameralabs
 AF-S DX VR Zoom-NIKKOR 18-200mm f/3.5-5.6G IF-ED review by Thom Hogan

Camera lenses introduced in 2005
Nikon F-mount lenses